Parliamentary elections were held in Czechoslovakia on 30 May 1948.  They were the first elections held after the 1948 Czechoslovak coup d'etat in which the Communist Party of Czechoslovakia (KSČ) had seized complete power and set up an undisguised Communist regime.

The Communists had become deeply unpopular, and all indications were that they would be voted out of office in the elections due in May. The endgame began on 13 February, when a majority of the cabinet demanded that Communist Interior Minister Václav Nosek stop packing the police with Communists.  Nosek refused, and was supported by Prime Minister and Communist Party leader Klement Gottwald.  On 21 February, 12 non-Communist ministers (out of a total of 27 members of government) resigned, believing that President Edvard Beneš would side with them and force Gottwald to either back down, resign, or call early elections that the Communists would not have time to rig.  Beneš initially supported their position, and refused to accept their resignations.  By this time, however, Gottwald had dropped all pretense of liberal democracy.  He not only refused to resign, but demanded the appointment of a Communist-dominated government under threat of a general strike.  His Communist colleagues occupied the offices of the non-Communist ministers.

Fearing Red Army intervention, Beneš gave way on 25 February and appointed a new government in accordance with Gottwald's demands.  Communists and pro-Moscow Social Democrats held most of the key posts. Members of the other parties still figured, so it was still technically a coalition.  However, all except Foreign Minister Jan Masaryk were fellow travellers handpicked by the Communists.  On 9 May, a new constitution was approved by the now-subservient Constituent National Assembly. Although it declared Czechoslovakia a "people's democratic state" and branded the coup as a defense of “the People's Democratic Order," it was not a completely Communist document. However, its Communist imprint was strong enough that Beneš refused to sign it.

The reconfigured government scheduled elections in which voters were presented with a single list from the National Front, a postwar coalition that had been converted into a Communist-dominated patriotic organisation. Voters could only reject the list by requesting a blank ballot.  The Front officially received 89.2 percent of the vote, with the Communists and their Slovak branch winning 214 of the 300 seats (160 for the main party and 54 for the Slovak branch), enough for a majority in their own right. Their majority grew even larger when the Social Democrats merged with the Communists later in the year. 

The non-socialist members of the Front were allowed to maintain their existence in order to keep up the appearance of pluralism. However, since no party could take part in the political process without KSČ approval, Communist control was now total. Representation was allocated in accordance with a set percentage. For the next four decades, voters would only have the option of approving or rejecting a single list from the National Front.

Beneš resigned three days after the elections, and Gottwald took over most presidential duties until his formal election as president 12 days later.

The 89.2 percent received by the Front would be the lowest vote share that it would claim during the 41 years of Communist rule in Czechoslovakia.  In subsequent elections, the Front would claim to win with 97 percent or more of the vote.

Results

References

Czechoslovakia
Elections in Communist Czechoslovakia
Parliamentary
Czechoslovakia